An incomplete series of events which happened in Italy in 1339:
 Battle of Parabiago
 Beginning of the Hundred Years' War (1339–1453)

Births
 Alexander V (Petros Philarges, 1339–1410) - antipope 1409-1410

Deaths
 Azzone I Visconti (1302–1339), Signore di Milano (1329–1339)

References

Italy
Italy
Years of the 14th century in Italy